Nicola Thorp, also known as Nicola Sian, (born 30 September 1988) is an English actress, columnist and activist. She is perhaps best known for her portrayal of Nicola Rubinstein in ITV soap opera Coronation Street.

Early life
Thorp was born in Blackpool, and attended Arnold School, where she was deputy head girl, before studying acting at the Arts Educational Schools of Acting in London between 2007 and 2010.

Career
In 2018, Thorp competed for ITV in Sport Relief'''s "Clash of the Channels" boat race, and started writing a regular column for freesheet Metro.co.uk, her first focusing on period poverty for women. Since 2019, Thorp has also been a regular contributor for This Morning.

Coronation Street
Thorp began appearing in Coronation Street as Nicola Rubinstein on 12 June 2017 as street villain Pat Phelan's (Connor McIntyre) daughter. Thorp's last appearance as Nicola Rubinstein was on 13 June 2018 at the conclusion of her storyline. On 11 November 2018, it was announced that Thorp would be reprising her role as Nicola, and she returned from 21 January to 1 February 2019.

Music career

In 2018, Thorp joined 26 other celebrities at Metropolis Studios, to perform an original Christmas song called Rock With Rudolph, written and produced by Grahame and Jack Corbyn. The song was recorded in aid of Great Ormond Street Hospital, and was released digitally through independent record label Saga Entertainment on 30 November 2018 under the artist name The Celebs. The music video debuted exclusively with The Sun newspaper online on 29 November 2018, and had its first TV showing on Good Morning Britain on 30 November 2018. The song peaked at number two on the iTunes pop chart.

Heels controversy
Thorp made headlines in 2016 after going public about an experience she had at PricewaterhouseCoopers as a temp worker: she was sacked as a temp receptionist in London after refusing to wear high heels, something mandated by her agency's "female grooming" policies at the time. An online petition that she started to highlight the situation was subsequently signed by nearly 110,000 people in less than 48 hours. The petition gained support from the media and members of parliament including Margot James, Caroline Dinenage ,and Tulip Siddiq. Thorp appeared on Good Morning Britain'' to talk about her petition and clashed with host Piers Morgan.

Thorp later appeared in front of a Parliamentary select committee to discuss the issue, and wrote articles in newspapers laying out her stance that she is not anti-high heels, but merely that it should not be necessary for certain jobs. As a result, the temp agency Portico changed its rules.

Personal life
Thorp was born in Blackpool, and her family still live in the North Shore area, where they make Blackpool rock.

In 2018, during an interview with Emma Barnett on Radio 5 Live, Thorp admitted to having been so depressed that it had led to a nervous breakdown six years before. She has also revealed that she has been diagnosed with borderline personality disorder.

Thorp lives on a canal boat, which she regularly moves to different moorings.

The Starstruck's actor Nikesh Patel is her partner.

Filmography

Awards and nominations

References

External links

Thorp discussing auditioning problems

1988 births
21st-century British actresses
English actresses
English soap opera actresses
English television actresses
Living people
People from Blackpool
People with borderline personality disorder
21st-century English women
21st-century English people